Satasidham  is a village development committee in Jhapa District in the Province No. 1 of south-eastern Nepal. At the time of the 1991 Nepal census it had a population of 20,809 people living in 3842 individual households. It was later merged with Shivaganj, Dharampur, and Panchgachhi to form the Shivasatakshi municipality.

References

Populated places in Jhapa District